13th Politburo may refer to:
 13th Politburo of the Chinese Communist Party
 Politburo of the 13th Congress of the All-Union Communist Party (Bolsheviks)
 13th Politburo of the Communist Party of Czechoslovakia
 13th Politburo of the Romanian Communist Party
 13th Politburo of the Communist Party of Czechoslovakia
 13th Politburo of the Communist Party of Vietnam
 13th Politburo of the League of Communists of Yugoslavia
 13th Politburo of the Hungarian Socialist Workers' Party